
This is a list of aircraft in numerical order of manufacturer followed by alphabetical order beginning with 'M'.

Ms

MSL Aero 
(Limoges-Fourches, France)
MSL Aero H80
MSL Aero H100
MSL Aero H2O
MSL Aero Type H

MS Parafly
(Meßstetten, Germany)
MS Parafly Skyward

MSrE 
(Műegyetemi Sportrepülő Egyesület – BME Sportrepülő Association)
 MSrE L.1 Mama Kedvence – (Mummy's Darling)
 MSrE L.2 Róma (Rome)
 MSrE L.4 Bohóc (Clown)
 MSrE BL.5 – Bánhidi & Lampich
 MSrE BL.6 – Bánhidi & Lampich
 MSrE BL.7 Holló (Crow) (Rebuilt BL-5)
 MSrE L.9
 MSrE L.9-II
 MSrE BL.16 – Bánhidi & Lampich
 MSrE M-19 (Rubik R-02) – Ernõ RUBIK
 MSrE M-20 (Rubik R-01) – Ernõ RUBIK and Endre JANCSÓ – MSrE
 MSrE M-21 Harag (Hungarian: "Fury") – Szegedy
 MSrE M-22 – András Szokolay & Endre Jancso – MSrE / Aero Ever Ltd., Aircraft Factory of Transylvania
 MSrE M-24 – Jancsó and Szegedy
 MSrE M-25 Nebuló (Urchin) – Jancsó
 MSrE M-27
 MSrE M-28 Daru (Crane)
 MSrE EM-29 Csóka (Jackdaw) – Jancsó and Szegedy
 MSrE M-30 Fergeteg
 Gerle 11 (Dove)
 Gerle 12
 Gerle 13
 Gerle 14
 Gerle 15
 Gerle 16
 Gerle 17
 Gerle 18
 EMESE-B – Rubik and Jancsó
 EMESE-C – re-designed by Tasnádi
 EMESE EM-27
 EMESE EM-29

MSW Aviation 
 MSW Votec 221
 MSW Votec 232
 MSW Votec 252SBS
 MSW Votec 252T
 MSW Votec 322
 MSW Votec 351
 MSW Votec 352T
 MSW Votec 452T

References

Further reading

External links 

 List of Aircraft (M)

fr:Liste des aéronefs (I-M)